The Ingenika Range is a small subrange of the Swannell Ranges of the Omineca Mountains, located south of Ingenika River above Swannell River in northern British Columbia, Canada.

References

Ingenika Range in the Canadian Mountain Encyclopedia

Swannell Ranges